Egypt competed at the 1972 Summer Olympics in Munich, West Germany.  The North African nation made its Olympic debut in 1912.

The Egyptian contingent included 28 male athletes, 1 female athlete and 18 officials. Because of the Munich massacre, some members of the Egyptians contingent left the Olympics early.

Results by event

Swimming
Men's 200m Freestyle
Kamel Aly Mostafa
 Heat — 2:05.30 (→ did not advance)

References

External links
Official Olympic Reports

1972 in Egyptian sport
Nations at the 1972 Summer Olympics
1972 Summer Olympics